Petre Hârtopeanu (15 June 1913, Dângeni, Botoșani County, Romania — 22 March 2001, Frankfurt-am-Main) was a Romanian-German painter and art professor.

Life 
Hârtopeanu began his studies and work in Iași. He studied at the Iași Academy of Fine Arts, where he had  Nicolae Tonitza as professor (1937). He later became a professor and dean at the Academy of Fine Arts.

After emigrating in 1970 from Romania, he lived in Frankfurt, West Germany. Hârtopeanu was married to Frida Klamer, a Medical Doctor, and had two daughters.

Art 
Beginning in 1975, he was a member of the Association for Free and Applied Arts EV Darmstadt, for decades a fixed place in the Darmstadt art life. From 1950 he had numerous exhibitions at home and abroad.

His paintings are an expression of his intense search for the perfect effect of a particular composition. The painting of the natural or cultural landscape was light and airy, determined by the play of light on the nature. His work still life by a clever arrangement by koloristische allure and subtle lighting. The symbols in his still lifes are often flowers, the glorification of God in his works. Plants, often tree-lined avenues represent the four seasons and symbolize the annual flow.

Books 
 Allgemeines Lexikon der bildenden Künstler des XX. Jahrhunderts 
 Who's who in Western Europe  von Ernest Kay - Europe - 1981 ... S-752 45 Uppsala, Sweden Hartopeanu. Petru. b 15 June 1913
 Hârtopeanu. Editura ARC 2000, București 2003,

External links 
tudor-art 

1913 births
2001 deaths
People from Botoșani County
George Enescu National University of Arts alumni
Romanian university and college faculty deans
20th-century Romanian painters
20th-century German painters
20th-century German male artists
German male painters
Expressionist painters
Post-impressionist painters
Romanian emigrants to Germany